The Territory of Louisiana or Louisiana Territory was an organized incorporated territory of the United States that existed from July 4, 1805, until June 4, 1812, when it was renamed the Missouri Territory. The territory was formed out of the District of Louisiana, which consisted of the portion of the Louisiana Purchase north of the 33rd parallel (which is now the Arkansas–Louisiana state line).

Background
The Eighth Congress of the United States on March 26, 1804, passed legislation entitled "An act erecting Louisiana into two territories, and providing for the temporary government thereof," which established the Territory of Orleans and the District of Louisiana as organized incorporated U.S. territories. With regard to the District of Louisiana, this organic act, which went into effect on October 1, 1804, detailed the authority of the governor and judges of the Indiana Territory to provide temporary civil jurisdiction over the expansive region.

Establishment
On March 3, 1805, Congress passed legislation changing the District of Louisiana into the Louisiana Territory, effective July 4, 1805.

Boundaries
The Louisiana Territory included all of the land acquired by the United States in the Louisiana Purchase north of the 33rd parallel. The eastern boundary of the purchase, the Mississippi River, functioned as the territory's eastern limit. Its northern and western boundaries, however, were indefinite, and remained so throughout its existence. The northern boundary with the British territory of Rupert's Land was established by the Treaty of 1818, and the western boundary with the Spanish viceroyalty of New Spain was defined by the Adams–Onís Treaty of 1819.

Subdivisions
The Louisiana Territory had five subdivisions: St. Louis District, St. Charles District, Ste. Genevieve District, Cape Girardeau District, and New Madrid District. In 1806, the territorial legislature created the District of Arkansas from lands ceded by the Osage Nation.

In the 1810 United States census, 6 counties in the Louisiana Territory (5 in contemporary Missouri and 1 in contemporary Arkansas reported the following population counts:

Government
The territorial capital was St. Louis.

On March 11, 1805, President Thomas Jefferson appointed Gen. James Wilkinson as the first governor of the Territory of Louisiana.
Wilkinson concurrently held the position of Senior Officer of the United States Army. Meriwether Lewis (1807–1809) served as the 2nd and William Clark (1813–1820) served as the 4th, and final, territorial governor.

Renaming
On June 4, 1812, the Twelfth U.S. Congress enacted legislation which renamed Louisiana Territory as Missouri Territory, in order to avoid confusion with the recently admitted State of Louisiana.

Current States
The areas of the  Louisiana Territory  and  Orleans Territory  now cover several U.S. states, from the Gulf of Mexico to the border of Canada.

U.S. states once part of Louisiana territory include:

 (part)

Canadian provinces once part of Louisiana territory include:

See also 

 Historic regions of the United States
 Territorial evolution of the United States
 Lewis and Clark Expedition

References

External links
  Louisiana: European Explorations and the Louisiana Purchase from the Library of Congress

 
L
Great Plains
Midwestern United States
1805 establishments in the United States
Pre-statehood history of Arkansas
Pre-statehood history of Iowa
Pre-statehood history of Kansas
Pre-statehood history of Louisiana
Pre-statehood history of Missouri
Pre-statehood history of Montana
Pre-statehood history of Nebraska
Pre-statehood history of North Dakota
Pre-statehood history of Oklahoma
Pre-statehood history of South Dakota
Pre-statehood history of Wyoming
1800s in the United States
1812 disestablishments in the United States